Downtown Smithfield Historic District is a national historic district located at  Smithfield, Johnston County, North Carolina.  It encompasses 24 contributing buildings in the central business district of Smithfield.  It includes notable examples of Classical Revival and Art Deco style architecture and buildings dating from about the 1890s through the 1930s. Located in the district is the separately listed Hood Brothers Building.  Other notable buildings include the Austin Building (1921), First Citizens Bank (1913), Carolina Telephone Building (1913), Municipal Building (1937), and the Howell Theater (1935).

It was listed on the National Register of Historic Places in 1993.

References

Commercial buildings on the National Register of Historic Places in North Carolina
Historic districts on the National Register of Historic Places in North Carolina
Neoclassical architecture in North Carolina
Art Deco architecture in North Carolina
Buildings and structures in Johnston County, North Carolina
National Register of Historic Places in Johnston County, North Carolina